Elvira Bach (born 22 June 1951) is a postmodernist German painter known for her colourful images of women. A member of the Junge Wilde art movement, she lives and works in Berlin. She is the mother of two children, including basketball player Maodo Lô.

Biography

Early life 
Elvira Bach was born on 22 June 1951 in Neuenhain in Hesse, West Germany. She grew up with her twin sister Ingrid in a rural setting.

Life and education 
From 1967 to 1970, Bach studied at the Erwin-Stein-Schule (state glass vocational school) in Hadamar . Afterwards, she moved to Berlin and studied painting from 1972 to 1979 at the Berlin University of the Arts with "Junge Wilde" or "Neue Wilde" titled painters Rainer Fetting and Salomé. During her studies, she worked at the playhouse Schaubühne in Berlin. In 1981, a scholarship led Elvira Bach to the Dominican Republic to study as an "artist in residence", and was greatly inspired by her experiences there. That same year, she was invited to participate in the "Documenta VII". This was her breakthrough that led to a number of national and international exhibitions of her artwork.

Collections and Exhibitions 

 1978: Metzgerei
 1979: bathtub paintings, SO 36, Berlin
 1982: documenta 7, Kassel
 1988: Refigured Painting - The German Image 1969–1988, Guggenheim Museum, New York
 1990/1991: Mannheimer Kunstverein, Mannheim and Kunsthalle Wilhelmshaven, Wilhelmshaven and Neue Galerie Graz
 1999: House on the Lützowplatz Berlin
 2001: Bavarian State Museum in Asbach Abbey
 2002: Kunsthalle Dominikanerkirche, Osnabrück
 2004: Kunstverein Salzgitter
 2006: Kronacher Kunstverein e. V., on the fortress Rosenberg
 2006: House on the Lützowplatz, Berlin
 2007: Gallery Noah, Augsburg
 2009: Stadtgalerie Bad Soden im Taunus; Influences africaines, Frauenmuseum Bonn
 2010: Museum of European Art (NRW), Nörvenich Castle, near Cologne
 2011: Galerie Jaeschke, Brunswick
 2012: Gallery Anne Moerchen, Hamburg 
 2013: Gallery Art350, Istanbul
 2013: Historic Town Hall, Limburg an der Lahn
 2015: Museum of Contemporary Art - Diether Kunerth, Ottobeuren
 Current: MoMA in New York, Vancouver Art Gallery, and the Museum of Art in Augsburg

Style 
Bach's neo-expressionist portraits of women mirror the themes of her own life, and many of her works unmistakably resemble the artist. She often depicts colorful female portraits that represent many facets of female life, from fragility to sensuality to self-determination.

Bach's works of the early 1980s were mostly self-reflective and focused on herself (Night Owl, Sophisticated Lady, Always Me). However, after her marriage and the birth of her two sons, her art became more representative of her new, more private family environment and home-life. Though Elvira Bach largely focuses on painting, she also works on bronze sculptures, ceramics and Murano glass sculptures.

See also
 List of German painters

References

External links
 Official website
 http://www.elvira-bach.de/
 http://www.elvira-bach.de/grafik.php

1951 births
Living people
20th-century German painters
21st-century German painters
German women artists
20th-century German women
21st-century German women
Neo-expressionist artists